The Botany Swarm is a semi-professional ice hockey team based in East Auckland, New Zealand. The team is a member of the New Zealand Ice Hockey League (NZIHL). The team was founded in 2005 as the South Auckland Swarm. Their name was changed prior to the 2007 season due to it being similar to one of the other teams and to better reflect the area in Auckland where their home rink is located (in the suburb of Botany Downs). They play their home games out of the Paradice Ice Skating Botany Rink known as The Hive.

History

2017 season

7 May 2017, the Swarm announced that after 11 seasons, head coach Andreas Kaißer has stepped down, and will be replaced by former Swarm alumnus Brandon Contratto. However due to personal reasons Brandon was unable to commit to the role. Former assistant coach Jeff Boehme took the role of head coach for the 2017 season.

The Botany Swarm welcomed four new imports for the 2017 season: Petr Zítka from the Czech Republic, Ryan Widmar from Illinois, Maximilian Hadraschek from Germany and Alex Mitsionis from Ohio.

2018 season
10 December 2017, the Swarm announced that Ian Wannamaker was appointed as the new head coach. Ian Wannamaker played for the Botany Swarm from 2007-2015 and represented New Zealand from 2010-2013, 2015.

23 December 2017, the Swarm announced that assistant coach of the Kelowna Rockets Travis Crickard was appointed as the new assistant coach.

The Botany Swarm welcomed four new imports for the 2018 season: Declan Weir an Irish Canadian, Harry Ferguson from Scotland, Colin Langham from Georgia and Lucas Bombardier from Vermont.

26 May 2018, Alexandr Polozov played his 100th game for the Botany Swarm against the Canterbury Red Devils.

9 June 2018, Jordan Challis played his 150th game for the Botany Swarm against the Dunedin Thunder.

21 July 2018, Logan Fraser played his 50th game for the Botany Swarm against the Dunedin Thunder.

5 August 2018, The Botany Swarm had their 200th NZIHL game.

2019 season
22 February 2019, Travis Crickard appointed Botany Swarm General Manager/CEO.

24 February 2019, Joel Rindelaub appointed Botany Swarm Interim Assistant General Manager.

The Botany Swarm welcomed four new imports for the 2019 season: Andrea Ricca from Italy, Corey McEwen born in Cardiff and now living in Toronto, Corey Morgan from New Jersey and Daniel Iasenza from Montreal.

11 May 2019, Michelle Cox appointed Botany Swarm Head Coach.

9 June 2019, Andrew Hay played his 200th game for the Botany Swarm against the West Auckland Admirals.

2021 season
The roster included goaltender Grace Harrison, one of only two women competing in the league.

Season by season results

Players

Current roster
Team roster for the 2018 NZIHL Season

Franchise scoring leaders
There are the top ten point scorers in franchise history. Figures are updated after each completed NZIHL regular season.

Franchise all-time most appearances
There are the top ten player who have made the most appearances in franchise history. Figures are updated after each completed NZIHL regular season.

Technical staff
Current as of 24 June 2019

Leaders

Team captains

Head coaches

References

External links

New Zealand Ice Hockey League teams
Sport in Auckland
Trans-Tasman Champions League